David Seltzer (born February 12, 1940) is an American screenwriter, producer and director, perhaps best known for writing the screenplays for The Omen (1976) and Bird on a Wire (1990). As writer-director, Seltzer's credits include the 1986 teen tragi-comedy Lucas starring Corey Haim, Charlie Sheen and Winona Ryder, the 1988 comedy Punchline starring Sally Field and Tom Hanks, and 1992's Shining Through starring Melanie Griffith and Michael Douglas.

Biography
Born to a Jewish family, Seltzer was uncredited for his contributions to the 1971 musical film Willy Wonka & the Chocolate Factory, the author of the original book, Roald Dahl, is credited as sole screenwriter; however it has been revealed that Seltzer rewrote 30% of Dahl's script, adding such elements as the "Slugworth subplot", music other than the original Oompa Loompa compositions (including Pure Imagination and The Candy Man), and the ending dialogue for the movie.

Seltzer's writing credits include the screenplays for The Omen, Prophecy, Six Weeks, My Giant, Dragonfly and Bird on a Wire, starring Mel Gibson and Goldie Hawn. He wrote and directed Lucas (1986), Punchline (1988), Shining Through (1992), and Nobody's Baby (2001).

Seltzer was reported to be writing an "Untitled Earthquake Project" for Hollywood director and producer J. J. Abrams, the plot of which is closely guarded, though it has been confirmed that the film is not a remake of 1974's disaster film Earthquake. Seltzer is also reportedly working on a UK remake of Alfred Hitchcock's Strangers on a Train, from the novel by Patricia Highsmith.

Partial filmography
(as Producer, Director, or Writer)
 Willy Wonka & the Chocolate Factory (1971) - Writer (uncredited)
 Two Is a Happy Number (1972) - Writer
 Larry (1974) - Co-writer
 The Other Side of the Mountain (1975) - Writer
 The Omen (1976) - Writer
 Green Eyes (TV-1977) - Producer and Co-writer
 Damien: Omen II (1978) - Character creator
 Prophecy (1979) - Writer
 Omen III: The Final Conflict (1981) - Character creator
 Six Weeks (1982) - Writer
 Table for Five (1983) - Writer
 Private Sessions (TV-1985) - Co-writer
 Lucas (1986) - Director and Writer
 Punchline (1988) - Director and Writer
 Bird on a Wire (1990) - Co-writer
 Omen IV: The Awakening (TV-1991) - Character creator
 Shining Through (1992) - Producer, Director, and Writer
 The Eighteenth Angel (1997) - Writer
 My Giant (1998) - Co-writer
 Dragonfly (2002) - Co-writer
 The Omen (2006) - Writer

References

External links
The Dialogue: Learn from the Masters Interview

American male screenwriters
Television producers from Illinois
Jewish American screenwriters
German-language film directors
People from Highland Park, Illinois
1940 births
Living people
Film directors from Illinois
Screenwriters from Illinois
21st-century American Jews